Arthur John Smiley (December 22, 1922 – July 30, 2000) was an American professional basketball player. Smiley played basketball for Waterman High School, in Waterman, Illinois. With Gene Vance, Andy Phillip, Ken Menke, and Art Mathisen, Smiley was a member of the University of Illinois' "Whiz Kids" team that went 35-6 from 1941 to 1943, earning two Big Ten Conference championships. The team voted to turn down an invitation to the NCAA tournament in 1943, after Smiley, Vance and Phillip were inducted into the military mid-season.

As an artillery corporal with the Army's 106th division, Smiley was engaged in one of the bloodiest skirmishes of the Battle of the Bulge- once firing his 105 mm Howitzer for 96 continuous hours.  The 106th division suffered a 90% casualty rate in the skirmish.

Smiley returned to Illinois for the 1946-47 season and won team MVP honors.

After college, Smiley played two seasons in the National Basketball Association with the Fort Wayne Pistons, Anderson Packers, and Waterloo Hawks. He averaged 6.2 points per game in his NBA career. Smiley also served as a player-coach for the Hawks for 27 games in the 1949-50 season, and posted an 11-16 record.

Smiley spent his later years in Des Moines, Iowa. He died in 2000.

BAA/NBA career statistics

Regular season

References

External links

1922 births
2000 deaths
All-American college men's basketball players
American men's basketball players
Anderson Packers players
Basketball coaches from Illinois
Basketball players from Illinois
Fort Wayne Pistons players
Forwards (basketball)
Guards (basketball)
Illinois Fighting Illini men's basketball players
Player-coaches
Waterloo Hawks coaches
Waterloo Hawks players